Carol Gracias is an Indian super model. She is a past winner of the coveted India's L'Oréal/Elite Look of the Year title. In 2006, she participated and became the runner-up in the reality show Bigg Boss 1.

Early life
Carol Gracias, Indian supermodel was brought up in Goan Catholic family in Mumbai.

Career

Film career
Carol played a cameo role in the movie Being Cyrus. She also appeared in the music video for the song "Right Here Right Now" in the movie Bluffmaster!, starring Abhishek Bachchan. She was a contestant on Bigg Boss 1, the Indian version of Celebrity Big Brother where she became the 1st runner-up. She also  participated in Fear Factor: Khatron Ke Khiladi 2, the Indian version of Fear Factor and emerged as the 2nd runner-up.

Wardrobe Malfunction
During the 2006 Lakme Fashion Week in Mumbai, Carol Gracias experienced a "wardrobe malfunction", when her halter top slipped off, completely exposing her breasts. She recovered quickly enough and completed the walk, holding her top in place. This minor incident caused a huge furor, with some members of the public accusing the organisers of the show of promoting obscenity. The matter was raised in the Maharashtra Legislative Assembly, where the members condemned the organisers of the show.

Later, a local court ordered the police to investigate the incident, after a social activist, Prakash Rajdev, registered an FIR against the organisers of Lakme India Fashion Week and the models involved, alleging that the incidents were intentional and the models indulged in "nudity and obscenity" which constituted offences under the Indian Penal Code.

Filmography

Television

References

Female models from Mumbai
Indian film actresses
Living people
Goan Catholics
Actresses from Mumbai
1978 births
21st-century Indian actresses
Fear Factor: Khatron Ke Khiladi participants
Bigg Boss (Hindi TV series) contestants
Goan people